Lao silk is produced in Laos with ancient weaving techniques that produce high quality silk. This woven cloth has traditionally been used for a wide range of purposes, including religious, ritual, and everyday uses. It is used for garments and home decorations by both upper class and rural individuals. Traditional patterns use bold color combinations, such as red and yellow.

References

External links

 Lao Textile Museum

Silk
Laotian culture